Luka Marković (born 19 February 2000) is a Serbian professional footballer who plays as a forward for Greek Super League 2 club Irodotos.

References

External links
 
 

2000 births
Living people
Association football forwards
Serbian footballers
Serbian expatriate footballers
FK Čukarički players
F.C. Crotone players
Juventus F.C. players
Torino F.C. players
FK Mačva Šabac players
FK Novi Pazar players
RFK Grafičar Beograd players
OFK Bačka players
Serbian SuperLiga players
Serbian expatriate sportspeople in Italy
Expatriate footballers in Italy